is a railway station in the town of Marumori, Miyagi Prefecture, Japan, operated by the third-sector railway operator AbukumaExpress

Lines

Station layout
The station has a single island platform connected to the station building by a level crossing. The station is staffed.

Adjacent stations

History
Marumori Station opened on April 1, 1968, as a station on the Japan National Railways (JNR). It became part of the Abukawa Express network from July 1, 1986.

Surrounding area
The station is located in a rural area over one kilometer north of the center of Marumori Town.

See also
 List of Railway Stations in Japan

External links

  

Railway stations in Miyagi Prefecture
Abukuma Express Line
Railway stations in Japan opened in 1968
Marumori, Miyagi